Adam Griffith is an Australian cricketer.

Adam Griffith may also refer to:

 Adam Griffith (American football), American football player

See also

 Adam Griffiths (born 1979), Australian football (soccer) player